Persoonia graminea is a species of flowering plant in the family Proteaceae and is endemic to the south-west of Western Australia.

Description

Taxonomy
Persoonia graminea was first formally described in 1810 by Robert Brown in Transactions of the Linnean Society of London from specimens he collected at King George Sound in December 1801.

Distribution and habitat
This geebung is found on poorly-drained or loamy soils in swamps, heath, woodland and forest within  of the coast between Margaret River and Albany.

Conservation status
Persoonia graminea is classified as "not threatened" by the Western Australian Government Department of Parks and Wildlife.

References

graminea
Flora of Western Australia
Proteales of Australia
Plants described in 1810
Taxa named by Robert Brown (botanist, born 1773)